Castberg is a Norwegian surname. Notable people with the surname include:

 Johan Castberg (1862–1926), Norwegian jurist and politician 
 Johan Christian Tandberg Castberg (1827–1899), Norwegian politician
 Peter Hersleb Harboe Castberg (1794–1858), Norwegian priest and politician

Norwegian-language surnames